Moon Kyung-ja (born 14 August 1965) is a South Korean former basketball player who competed in the 1984 Summer Olympics. Her daughter Yang Ji-yeong, a graduate of Sookmyung Girls' High School, was drafted by the Women's Korean Basketball League Yongin Samsung Life Bichumi team in 2011.

References

1965 births
Living people
South Korean women's basketball players
Basketball players at the 1984 Summer Olympics
Medalists at the 1984 Summer Olympics
Olympic basketball players of South Korea
Olympic silver medalists for South Korea
Olympic medalists in basketball
Basketball players at the 1986 Asian Games
Asian Games medalists in basketball
Asian Games silver medalists for South Korea
Medalists at the 1986 Asian Games